is a passenger railway station in located in the city of Katano, Osaka Prefecture, Japan, operated by the private railway company Keihan Electric Railway.

Lines
Katanoshi Station is a station of the  Keihan Katano Line, and is located 4.4 kilometers from the terminus of the line at Hirakatashi Station.

Station layout
The station has two ground-level opposed side platforms connected by an elevated station building.

Platforms

Adjacent stations

History
It was renamed November 1, 1977.

Passenger statistics
In fiscal 2019, the station was used by an average of 10,295 passengers daily.

Surrounding area
Katano City Hall

See also
List of railway stations in Japan

References

External links

Official home page 

Railway stations in Osaka Prefecture
Railway stations in Japan opened in 1929
Katano, Osaka